A Wicked Ghost II: The Fear is a 2000 Hong Kong horror film directed by Francis Nam, starring Joey Meng, Angie Cheung, Alice Chan, Ken Wong and Joyce Chan. It is preceded by A Wicked Ghost in 1999 and followed by A Wicked Ghost III: The Possession in 2002.

Plot
Three police officers (Li, Peanut and Cha-siu) attempt to nab a serial rapist but he escapes and flees to a construction site, where he is found dead later with his body dismembered. Cha-siu had also committed suicide by shooting himself. The mysterious deaths baffle Li, Peanut and their colleague Willis Tao. The case also attracts the attention of two reporters (Balm and Coffee) and Blue, a writer of supernatural stories. Balm encounters the rapist's ghost while secretly taking photos of the body parts and gets knocked down by a car. Peanut's cousin Ada blinds herself after watching A Wicked Ghost, claiming that she saw a ghost similar to the one in the movie. Balm and Ada commit suicide later; Ada's sister Clever attempts suicide after seeing the ghosts of the twin girls she had aborted, but is saved by a blessed coin. Willis Tao goes into a trance after stealing a metal nail from the construction site and tries to kill his colleagues, but they subdue him and send him to hospital.

Blue retrieves a special sound recorder she gave to Ada earlier that can record sounds inaudible to the human ear. She plays it and hears a hoarse female voice calling out the name of Peanut's great-grandmother Hwa Yuet-may. She also learns that the construction site was previously the Hwa family residence. Peanut and Li also suspect that they might be the reincarnations of Peanut's great-grandparents after seeing the resemblance in an old photo. One night, Blue brings Peanut and Li to the construction site to hypnotise them and help them recall their past lives; Coffee and Clever join them.

Under hypnosis, Peanut and Li learn that her great-grandfather loved Tift, but was forced to marry Hwa, who was from a rich family. Hwa was so jealous of Tift that she hired thugs to kidnap Tift and rape her before chopping off her limbs. Peanut's great-grandfather could not bear to see his lover being tormented so he killed himself. Tift was ultimately stabbed in the head by Suet, her friend who betrayed her to Hwa. She became a vengeful ghost after death and sought vengeance on the Hwa family.

When Peanut recovers from her trance, she realises that Coffee is Suet's reincarnation. In the meantime, Tift's ghost has possessed Blue and she corners Peanut and Coffee and tries to strangle them to death. Just then, Clever manages to trap Tift by shining spiritual lights on her. At this critical moment, the ghost of Peanut's great-grandfather leaves Li's body and saves Tift. Tift gives up her desire for revenge after reuniting with her lover and they leave together.

Cast
 Joey Meng as Blue / Tift
 Alice Chan as Peanut / Hwa Yuet-may
 Ken Wong as Inspector Li / Peanut's great-grandfather
 Angie Cheung as Coffee / Suet
 Joyce Chan as Clever
 Isa Chow as Ada
 Wu Kai-kong as Willis Tao
 Man Yeung as suspect
 Tang Wing-san as Officer Hwang
 Lee Kin-yan as Balm

External links
 
 

2000 films
Hong Kong supernatural horror films
2000s Cantonese-language films
2000s supernatural horror films
2000s Hong Kong films